The meridian 139° west of Greenwich is a line of longitude that extends from the North Pole across the Arctic Ocean, North America, the Pacific Ocean, the Southern Ocean, and Antarctica to the South Pole.

The 139th meridian west forms a great circle with the 41st meridian east.

From Pole to Pole
Starting at the North Pole and heading south to the South Pole, the 139th meridian west passes through:

{| class="wikitable plainrowheaders"
! scope="col" width="130" | Co-ordinates
! scope="col" | Country, territory or sea
! scope="col" | Notes
|-
| style="background:#b0e0e6;" | 
! scope="row" style="background:#b0e0e6;" | Arctic Ocean
| style="background:#b0e0e6;" |
|-
| style="background:#b0e0e6;" | 
! scope="row" style="background:#b0e0e6;" | Beaufort Sea
| style="background:#b0e0e6;" |
|-
| 
! scope="row" | 
| Yukon  — Herschel Island
|-
| style="background:#b0e0e6;" | 
! scope="row" style="background:#b0e0e6;" | Beaufort Sea
| style="background:#b0e0e6;" | Mackenzie Bay
|-valign="top"
| 
! scope="row" | 
| Yukon British Columbia — for about 2 km from 
|-
| 
! scope="row" | 
| Alaska
|-
| style="background:#b0e0e6;" | 
! scope="row" style="background:#b0e0e6;" | Pacific Ocean
| style="background:#b0e0e6;" | Passing just west of Fatu Huku island,  (at )
|-valign="top"
| 
! scope="row" | 
| Hiva Oa island
|-valign="top"
| style="background:#b0e0e6;" | 
! scope="row" style="background:#b0e0e6;" | Pacific Ocean
| style="background:#b0e0e6;" | Passing just east of Tahuata island,  (at ) Passing just west of Mohotani island,  (at ) Passing just west of Puka-Puka atoll,  (at ) Passing just east of Akiaki atoll,  (at ) Passing just west of Vahitahi atoll,  (at ) Passing just west of Nukutavake island,  (at ) Passing just east of Vairaatea atoll,  (at ) Passing just east of Vanavana atoll,  (at )
|-valign="top"
| 
! scope="row" | 
| Moruroa atoll
|-valign="top"
| style="background:#b0e0e6;" | 
! scope="row" style="background:#b0e0e6;" | Pacific Ocean
| style="background:#b0e0e6;" | Passing just west of Fangataufa atoll,  (at )
|-
| style="background:#b0e0e6;" | 
! scope="row" style="background:#b0e0e6;" | Southern Ocean
| style="background:#b0e0e6;" |
|-
| 
! scope="row" | Antarctica
| Unclaimed territory
|-
|}

See also
138th meridian west
140th meridian west

w139 meridian west